Carlisle Gymnasium is an indoor arena on the campus of the University of New Mexico in Albuquerque, New Mexico. It was the home of the New Mexico Lobos basketball team from its opening in 1928 until the completion of the larger Johnson Gymnasium in 1957, and was also the original venue of the New Mexico Symphony Orchestra. The building currently houses the university's Elizabeth Waters Center for Dance.

The building was designed by the firm of Gaastra, Gladding and Johnson in the Pueblo Revival architectural style, which was the de facto official style for all new buildings on campus. In a novel application of the style, the architects used stepped massing, vigas, and other Pueblo details to mask the rectilinear form of the gymnasium. The building was completed at a cost of approximately $85,000 and was named after Hugh Carlisle, a UNM student who died in World War I. Carlisle Gymnasium was added to the New Mexico State Register of Cultural Properties and the National Register of Historic Places in 1988.

References

External links

Indoor arenas in New Mexico
Basketball venues in New Mexico
Defunct college basketball venues in the United States
New Mexico Lobos basketball venues
Sports venues in Albuquerque, New Mexico
Sports venues completed in 1928
Event venues on the National Register of Historic Places in New Mexico
New Mexico State Register of Cultural Properties
Pueblo Revival architecture in Albuquerque, New Mexico
1928 establishments in New Mexico
National Register of Historic Places in Albuquerque, New Mexico
Sports venues on the National Register of Historic Places
University of New Mexico